Houshang Montazeralzohour (born 21 July 1947-executed in 1982) was an Iranian Greco-Roman wrestler who competed in the 1976 Summer Olympics.

Houshang Montazeralzohour was the national champion of Iran in 82 kg weight class for several years. He was later arrested and executed by the Iranian Government for his association with the main Iranian opposition organization, known as the MEK, which reportedly wanted to topple the regime and replace it with a secular, democratic one.

References

1951 births
1982 deaths
Olympic wrestlers of Iran
Wrestlers at the 1976 Summer Olympics
Iranian male sport wrestlers